Mory Diaw (born 22 June 1993) is a French professional footballer who plays as a goalkeeper for  club Clermont.

Club career
Diaw began his career in the youth teams of Paris Saint-Germain (PSG). He made one senior appearance, playing 17 minutes in a friendly against TSV Hartberg on 8 July 2014. After being released by PSG in 2015, Diaw signed for Portuguese Segunda Liga outfit Mafra on 29 July 2015.

In April 2017, Diaw went on trial with EFL Championship side Leeds United. He joined Bulgarian side Lokomotiv Plovdiv in July 2017. Following a short and successful trial period, on 8 July 2017 he signed a 2-year contract.

In 2019, Diaw joined FC United Zürich in Switzerland. In June 2019, he signed for second-tier Swiss club Lausanne-Sport, where he replaced the injured second goalkeeper Dany Da Silva. 

Diaw made his return to France on 14 June 2022, signing for Ligue 1 side Clermont on a two-year contract with an option for a further year.

Personal life
Born in France, Diaw is of Senegalese descent.

During his time at Paris Saint-Germain, Diaw became a trending topic on social media site Twitter after a string of obscene tweets posted by his account. Tweets included vulgar jokes and even posting the phone number of teammate Zlatan Ibrahimović. Club officials were quick to address the issue, claiming Diaw's account had been hacked. The tweets have since been deleted.

Honours 
Paris Saint-Germain U19

 Championnat National U19: 2010–11

References

External links
 

1993 births
Living people
People from Poissy
French footballers
Association football goalkeepers
Paris Saint-Germain F.C. players
C.D. Mafra players
PFC Lokomotiv Plovdiv players
FC Lausanne-Sport players
Clermont Foot players
Liga Portugal 2 players
Segunda Divisão players
First Professional Football League (Bulgaria) players
Swiss Super League players
Swiss Challenge League players
Ligue 1 players
French expatriate footballers
French expatriate sportspeople in Portugal
Expatriate footballers in Portugal
French expatriate sportspeople in Bulgaria
Expatriate footballers in Bulgaria
French expatriate sportspeople in Switzerland
Expatriate footballers in Switzerland
French sportspeople of Senegalese descent
Footballers from Yvelines